See Through You is the sixth studio album by noise rock band A Place to Bury Strangers. It was released on February 4, 2022, by Dedstrange.

Release
On November 16, 2021, the band announced the release of the album, alongside the first single "Let's See Each Other". On December 7, the band released their second single "Hold On Tight". "I'm Hurt", the album's third single, was released on January 18, 2022. The single "I Disappear (When You're Near)" and its accompanying music video was released alongside the album on February 4, 2022.

Tour
The band has announced a world tour from March 2022 to June 2022 in support of the album.

Track listing

References 

2022 albums
A Place to Bury Strangers albums